Retail Benchmarking is an annual critical inspection of the current retail environment. The aim of a Retail Benchmarking is to highlight areas of excellence and short fallings in customer services and to give retailers the data needed to improve across the board. 

Objectives of Retail Benchmarking include, but are not limited to:
 Establishing how outlet staff deal with prospective customers inquiring about making a purchase.
 Establishing how outlet staff deal with a customer making an inquiring and raising objections about products and services.
 Establishing whether outlet staff make attempt to up-sell, cross-sell and add on products.
 Establishing whether outlet staff are proficient and enthusiastic in regards to product knowledge.
 Overall customer service and sales performance of each of the outlets.

First UAE Retail Benchmarking Study 
The first UAE based Retail Benchmarking Report was released by Ethos Consultancy in May 2009. The report represents the most comprehensive study of the complete customer experience in the UAE retail sector ever undertaken.  Throughout the study carried out during end April and early May 2009, Ethos measured 22 retail sectors with a total of 2284 physical location visits to a total of 558 retail outlets covering 115 brand names. A total of 37 retail shopping locations were involved in the study including 10 major malls throughout the UAE. Pure Gold Jewellers was not only awarded overall best performing brand by Ethos Consulting, it was also awarded Best Brand Honor for the 2nd year running from Dubai Government.

References

External links
 UAE Retail Benchmarking Report 2009

Retailing in the United Arab Emirates